Ahmad Ali Elias is a Jordanian footballer who plays for Al-Wehdat and the Jordan national football team.

International career
Elias's first international match with his national team was against Syria, when he entered as a substitute for his teammate Adnan Adous, on 16 December 2012 in the 2012 WAFF Championship in which Jordan lost 2–1.

International goals

With U-23

International career statistics

References

External links
 
 

1990 births
Living people
Jordanian footballers
Jordan international footballers
Jordan youth international footballers
Jordanian people of Palestinian descent
Association football forwards
Jordanian Pro League players
Al-Wehdat SC players
2015 AFC Asian Cup players
Footballers at the 2010 Asian Games
Sportspeople from Amman
Asian Games competitors for Jordan
21st-century Jordanian people